Andrea Thopia or Andrew Thopia (died before March 1445) was a 15th century Albanian noble man whose domains included the territory of Scuria (between Durazzo and what would later become modern day Tirana). He was a member of the Thopia family and one of the founders of the League of Lezhë.

Family 
Andrea Thopia was the nephew of Karl Thopia. He had two sons Karl Muzaka and Komnin. He was son of Nikete Topia died 1414/1415

1432—1436 rebellion 

After the Battle of Savra in 1385 the region of Albania became under strong Ottoman influence and gradually most of its territory was annexed to Ottoman Empire within separate administrative unit: the Sanjak of Albania. Andrea revolted against Ottoman rule in 1432 and defeated a small Ottoman military unit in the mountains of Central Albania. His victory inspired other chieftains in Albania, especially Gjergj Arianiti, to rebel against the Ottomans.

League of Lezhë 

Together with his nephew (Tanush Thopia) Andrea participated in founding of the League of Lezhë (1444 military alliance led by Skanderbeg). The members included Lekë Zaharia, Pjetër Spani, Lekë Dushmani, Andrea Thopia, Gjergj Arianiti, Theodor Muzaka, Stefan Crnojević, and their subjects. His title was Lord of Scuria (near Durazzo).

According to Gjon Muzaka, Andrea Thopia was among the members of this league who outlived the fall of Scutari into Ottoman hands in 1479.

In literature 

Girolamo de Rada, an Italian writer of Italo-Albanian literature, dedicated his 1839 work Albanian Historical Songs of Serafina Thopia, Wife of Prince Nicholas Dukagjini to unfulfilled love of Serafina Thopia and Bosdare Stresa (an Albanian Romeo and Juliet). Serafina, who was daughter of Andrea Thopia in this song, sacrificed her love to Bosdare and married Nicholas Dukagjini to help uniting southern and northern Albania to fight against the Ottomans.

Annotations

References

Sources

 

15th-century Albanian people
Andrea
Medieval Albanian nobility
Albanian Roman Catholics